The Hamblen Block or Hamblen's Row is a historic series of four row houses at 188-194 Danforth Street in Portland, Maine, USA, Built in 1835, it is one of the oldest such buildings in the state, and also a rare example, as comparatively few row houses were built anywhere in the state. The row houses were added to the National Register of Historic Places in 1983, and are a contributing property to the larger Hamblen Development Historic District.

Description and history
The Hamblen Block is located on the east side of Portland's West End neighborhood, on the southeast side of Danforth Street, between Brackett and Clark Streets. It consists of four virtually identical row houses, each three bays wide and three stories high. They are built of brick and have gabled roofs separated by party walls with rectangular brick chimneys projecting from the left side. Entrances are located in the rightmost bay, recessed in an opening flanked by pilasters and topped by an entablature and cornice. One of the units has a later 19th-century two-leaf door, while the others have single doors flanked by sidelight windows.

The row houses were built in 1835 by Nathaniel and Eli Hamblen, developers who were active in pushing the city's development westward from the port area. The only known block of similar age in the state is located in Bangor and has been significantly altered. The Hamblen's development of the area continued with the buildings to the west of this one, which together form the Hamblen Development Historic District.

See also
National Register of Historic Places listings in Portland, Maine

References

Houses in Portland, Maine
Houses on the National Register of Historic Places in Maine
National Register of Historic Places in Portland, Maine
Historic district contributing properties in Maine
Houses completed in 1835
Greek Revival houses in Maine